Zbudská Belá is a village and municipality in the Medzilaborce District in the Prešov Region of far north-eastern Slovakia.

History
In historical records the village was first mentioned in 1463.

Geography
The municipality lies at an altitude of 272 metres and covers an area of 15.973 km². It has a population of about 130 people.

External links
https://web.archive.org/web/20071116010355/http://www.statistics.sk/mosmis/eng/run.html

Villages and municipalities in Medzilaborce District
Zemplín (region)